Smith's mountain keelback (Opisthotropis spenceri), also known commonly as Spencer's stream snake, is a species of snake in the family Colubridae. The species is endemic to Thailand.

Etymology
The specific name, spenceri, is in honor of Mr. F.D. Spencer who collected the type specimen.

Habitat
The preferred natural habitat of O. spenceri is flowing streams.

Description
Dorsally, it is olive-colored. Ventrally it is yellowish white on the body, with gray mottling on the tail. It has smooth dorsal scales, which are arranged in 17 rows.

Behavior
O. spenceri is aquatic and nocturnal.

Diet
O. spenceri preys upon freshwater shrimp, earthworms, fishes, frogs, and tadpoles.

Reproduction
O. spenceri is oviparous.

References

Further reading
Chan-ard T, Parr JWK, Nabhitabhata J (2015). A Field Guide to the Reptiles of Thailand. New York: Oxford University Press. 352 pp.  (hardcover),  (paperback).
Chuaynkern Y, Duengkae P, Pongcharoen C, Chuaynkern C, Horsin L (2014). "Opisthotropis spenceri SMITH, 1918 (SERPENTES: NATRICIDAE): THE THIRD AND FOURTH SPECIMENS". Journal of Wildlife in Thailand 21 (1): 1–14.
Smith MA (1918). "Description of a New Snake (Opisthotropis spenceri) from Siam". Journal of the Natural History Society of Siam 3 (1): 13 + plate.

Reptiles of Thailand
Opisthotropis
Reptiles described in 1918
Taxa named by Malcolm Arthur Smith
Taxonomy articles created by Polbot